Over You may refer to:

"Over You" (Anne Murray song), 1994
"Over You" (Daughtry song), 2007
"Over You" (Gary Puckett & The Union Gap song), 1968
"Over You" (Girlicious song), 2010
"Over You" (Lasgo song), 2009
"Over You" (Miranda Lambert song), 2012
"Over You" (Roxy Music song), 1980
"Over You" (Safia song), 2016
"Over You" (Tender Mercies song), from the film Tender Mercies, 1983
"Over You", a song by Aaron Neville, 1960
"Over You", a song by Bilal Hassani from Kingdom, 2019
"Over You", a song by Goo Goo Dolls from Miracle Pill, 2019
"Over You", a song by Paul Revere & the Raiders, 1964
"Over You", a song by Supertramp from Slow Motion, 2002
"Over You". a song by Almira Zaky which represented Virginia from American Song Contest
"I'm Over Dreaming (Over You)", a song by Kylie Minogue from Enjoy Yourself, 1989

See also
I'm Over You (disambiguation)